The 2017–18 Oklahoma City Thunder season was the 10th season of the franchise in Oklahoma City and the 52nd in the National Basketball Association (NBA). This season was headlined by the acquisitions of All-Star players Paul George and Carmelo Anthony in trades with the Indiana Pacers and New York Knicks respectively, in addition to the reigning MVP Russell Westbrook signing a five-year extension worth $205 million. The trio was dubbed the "Big Three" as well as "OK3". The Thunder clinched their playoff berth for the eight time in the last nine seasons with a win over the Miami Heat in a rematch of the 2012 Finals on April 9, 2018.

They finished the regular season with 48–34, which clinched the 4th seed. In the playoffs, the Thunder faced the 5th seeded Utah Jazz in the First Round, a team led by rookie Donovan Mitchell, and lost in six games.

After averaging a then-career low 16.2 points per game during the season, Anthony was traded to the Atlanta Hawks in the offseason, ending the Thunder's Big Three experiment. The season also marked the end of long-time veteran Nick Collison's career, after 14 years. Sometimes referred to as "Mr. Thunder", Collison appeared once in the finals (2012), and following his retirement, became the only player from the 2003 draft to play their entire career with the team that drafted them, and it also left Jeff Green of the Cleveland Cavaliers and Kevin Durant of the Golden State Warriors as the last remaining active players who played for the then-Seattle SuperSonics, with Mark Bryant and Sam Presti being the last remaining staff members that have been with the Thunder since the Sonics' final season in 2007–08.

Previous season
The Thunder finished the 2016–17 season 47–35 to finish in second place in the Northwest Division, sixth in the Western Conference and qualified for the playoffs. Last season featured Russell Westbrook breaking Oscar Robertson's record for most triple doubles in a season with 42. Westbrook was later named the 2016-17 NBA Most Valuable Player. Westbrook earned MVP honors after joining Oscar Roberson as the only player in NBA history to average a triple-double. Westbrook registered a league-best 31.6 points, 10.7 rebounds (10th in the NBA), 10.4 assists (third in the NBA) and 1.63 steals in 34.6 minutes per game.

Offseason

Draft picks

The Thunder had only their own first-round pick entering the draft. The Thunder traded their 2017 second-round pick in the Joffrey Lauvergne trade to the Denver Nuggets back in 2016. The Thunder ended 2017 NBA Draft night with Australia's NBL Terrance Ferguson.

Trades

On July 6, the Thunder traded Victor Oladipo and Domantas Sabonis to the Indiana Pacers in exchange for Paul George. George was traded by the Pacers after rumors of George wanting to leave in free agency for the Los Angeles Lakers. The Thunder decided to trade and gamble that a season with George on the roster will entice him to re-sign long term. George came to the Thunder as a four-time All Star, winner of the 2012–13 season Most Improved Player Award, All-NBA Third team honors three times, NBA All-Defensive First Team once and All-Defensive Second team twice.

On September 25, the Thunder traded Enes Kanter, Doug McDermott and a 2018 second-round pick via CHI to the New York Knicks in exchange for Carmelo Anthony. Anthony had been the focal point of intense trade speculation throughout the offseason while owning a no-trade clause in his contract. Both Russell Westbrook and Paul George "played an immense part" in convincing Anthony to waive his no-trade clause to join the Thunder. Anthony came to the Thunder as a 10-time All Star, All-NBA Second team honors two times, All-NBA Third team honors four times and a three-time Olympic gold medalist.

Free agency

For this offseason, free agency began on July 1st, 2017 while the July moratorium ended on July 6. Norris Cole, Nick Collison and Taj Gibson were set to hit unrestricted free agency while Andre Roberson was set to hit restricted free agency. On July 2, it was reported that Taj Gibson agreed to a two-year, $28 million deal with the Minnesota Timberwolves, which he later signed on July 10. On July 5, it was reported that Andre Roberson agreed to a three-year, $30 million contract extension to stay with the Thunder, which he later signed on July 14. On July 21, Nick Collison agreed to a new contract to stay with the Thunder. Sam Presti called Collison "one of the founding members of our organization and culture, it goes without saying that he has helped set internal standards and built a legacy that Thunder fans will remain indebted to for years to come." Cole, who was not re-signed, signed a one-year deal with the Israeli team Maccabi Tel Aviv of the EuroLeague.

On July 7, it was reported that Raymond Felton agreed to a one-year, $2.3 million deal with the Thunder, which he later signed on July 10. Felton spent the 2016–17 season with the LA Clippers. A day after losing Taj Gibson, on July 4, it was reported that Patrick Patterson agreed to a three-year, $16.4 million deal with the Thunder, which he later signed on July 10. Patterson spent the 2016–17 season with the Toronto Raptors.

On July 22, Dakari Johnson signed a deal with the Thunder. Johnson was originally selected 48th overall in the 2015 NBA Draft but did not a sign a contract in the 2015–16 season, instead playing two seasons with the Oklahoma City Blue.

Starting in the 2017–18 season, each team is allowed two players on two-way contracts, in addition to the standard 15 players on the roster. On August 3, Daniel Hamilton signed a two-way contract with the Thunder, splitting time with the Thunder and the Oklahoma City Blue. Hamilton spent the 2016-17 season season with the Blue. To fill in the other slot, PJ Dozier signed a two-way contract with the Thunder on October 17. Dozier came undrafted out of South Carolina.

On October 14, Semaj Christon was waived by the Thunder as his $1.3 million salary would have become fully guaranteed for the season. The Thunder opted for 14 guaranteed roster spots rather than 15.

On September 29, Russell Westbrook agreed to a five-year, $205 million contract extension with the Thunder. Westbrook's deal was the biggest guaranteed contract at the time in 2017.

Front office and coaching changes
On May 15, Thunder assistant Anthony Grant was hired as the head coach of the Dayton Flyers. Coming over when Billy Donovan was hired, Grant served as an assistant coach for the Thunder for two seasons.

On October 2, the Thunder announced Rob Hennigan as Vice President of Insight & Foresight. Hennigan rejoins the Thunder after serving as the general manager of the Orlando Magic for five seasons.

Roster

Standings

Conference

Division

Game log

Preseason

|- style="background:#fcc;"
| 1
| October 3
| Houston
| 
| Carmelo Anthony (19)
| Josh Huestis (7)
| Isaiah Canaan (6)
| BOK Center17,733
| 0–1
|- style="background:#cfc;"
| 2
| October 6
| New Orleans
| 
| Paul George (25)
| Daniel Hamilton (8)
| Daniel Hamilton (5)
| Chesapeake Energy ArenaN/A
| 1–1
|- style="background:#cfc;"
| 3
| October 8
| Melbourne
| 
| Paul George (22)
| Steven Adams (10)
| Russell Westbrook(7)
| Chesapeake Energy ArenaN/A
|2–1
|- style="background:#cfc;"
| 4
| October 10
| @ Denver
| 
| Russell Westbrook(20)
| Paul George (11)
| Russell Westbrook(7)
| Pepsi Center10,000
| 3–1

Regular season

|- style="background:#cfc;"
| 1
| October 19
| New York
| 
| Paul George (28)
| Russell Westbrook (10)
| Russell Westbrook (16)
| Chesapeake Energy Arena18,203
| 1–0
|- style="background:#fcc;"
| 2
| October 21
| @ Utah
| 
| Carmelo Anthony (26)
| Russell Westbrook (10)
| Russell Westbrook (16)
| Vivint Smart Home Arena18,300
| 1–1
|- style="background:#fcc;"
| 3
| October 22
| Minnesota
| 
| Russell Westbrook (31)
| Steven Adams (13)
| Russell Westbrook (10)
| Chesapeake Energy Arena18,203
| 1–2
|- style="background:#cfc;"
| 4
| October 25
| Indiana
| 
| Anthony, Westbrook (28)
| Steven Adams (13)
| Russell Westbrook (16)
| Chesapeake Energy Arena18,203
| 2–2
|- style="background:#fcc;"
| 5
| October 27
| @ Minnesota
| 
| Russell Westbrook (27)
| Adams, Westbrook (8)
| Russell Westbrook (9)
| Target Center17,620
| 2–3
|- style="background:#cfc;"
| 6
| October 28
| @ Chicago
| 
| Carmelo Anthony (21)
| Russell Westbrook (13)
| Russell Westbrook (13)
| United Center21,706
| 3–3
|- style="background:#cfc;"
| 7
| October 31
| @ Milwaukee
| 
| Paul George (28)
| Steven Adams (11)
| Russell Westbrook (9)
| Bradley Center16,713
| 4–3

|- style="background:#fcc;"
| 8
| November 3
| Boston
| 
| Paul George (25)
| Carmelo Anthony (14)
| Russell Westbrook (11)
| Chesapeake Energy Arena18,203
| 4–4
|- style="background:#fcc;"
| 9
| November 5
| @ Portland
| 
| Paul George (27)
| Jerami Grant (7)
| Russell Westbrook (9)
| Moda Center  19,393
| 4–5
|- style="background:#fcc;"
| 10
| November 7
| @ Sacramento
| 
| Russell Westbrook (20)
| Russell Westbrook (12)
| Russell Westbrook (6)
| Golden 1 Center  17,583
| 4–6
|- style="background:#fcc;"
| 11
| November 9
| @ Denver
| 
| Carmelo Anthony (28)
| Steven Adams (11)
| Roberson, Westbrook (5)
| Pepsi Center 19,520
| 4–7
|- style="background:#cfc;"
| 12
| November 10
| LA Clippers
| 
| Paul George (42)
| Andre Roberson (11)
| Russell Westbrook (8)
| Chesapeake Energy Arena18,203
| 5–7
|- style="background:#cfc;"
| 13
| November 12
| Dallas
| 
| Paul George (37)
| George, Grant (8)
| Felton, George, Westbrook (5)
| Chesapeake Energy Arena18,203
| 6–7
|- style="background:#cfc;"
| 14
| November 15
| Chicago
| 
| Russell Westbrook (21)
| Carmelo Anthony (11)
| Russell Westbrook (7)
| Chesapeake Energy Arena 18,203
| 7–7
|- style="background:#fcc;"
| 15
| November 17
| @ San Antonio
| 
| Carmelo Anthony (20)
| Russell Westbrook (9)
| Russell Westbrook (9)
| AT&T Center  18,418
| 7–8
|- style="background:#fcc;"
| 16
| November 20
| @ New Orleans
| 
| Paul George (37)
| Russell Westbrook (16)
| Russell Westbrook (12)
| Smoothie King Center16,765
| 7–9
|- style="background:#cfc;"
| 17
| November 22
| Golden State
| 
| Russell Westbrook (34)
| Steven Adams (12)
| Russell Westbrook (9)
| Chesapeake Energy Arena18,203
| 8–9
|- style="background:#fcc;"
| 18
| November 24
| Detroit
| 
| Russell Westbrook (27)
| Steven Adams (12)
| Russell Westbrook (11)
| Chesapeake Energy Arena18,203
| 8–10
|- style="background:#fcc;"
| 19
| November 25
| @ Dallas
| 
| Russell Westbrook (28)
| Russell Westbrook (12)
| Paul George (10)
| American Airlines Center20,340
| 8–11
|- style="background:#fcc;"
| 20
| November 29
| @ Orlando
| 
| Russell Westbrook (37)
| Russell Westbrook (11)
| George, Westbrook (5)
| Amway Center 17,797
| 8–12

|- style="background:#cfc;"
| 21
| December 1
| Minnesota
| 
| Paul George (36)
| Russell Westbrook (9)
| Russell Westbrook (12)
| Chesapeake Energy Arena18,203
| 9–12
|- style="background:#cfc;"
| 22
| December 3
| San Antonio
| 
| Russell Westbrook (22)
| Adams, Westbrook (10)
| Russell Westbrook (10)
| Chesapeake Energy Arena18,203
| 10–12
|- style="background:#cfc;"
| 23
| December 5
| Utah
| 
| Russell Westbrook (34)
| Russell Westbrook (13)
| Russell Westbrook (14)
| Chesapeake Energy Arena18,203
| 11–12
|- style="background:#fcc;"
| 24
| December 7
| @ Brooklyn
| 
| Russell Westbrook (31)
| Steven Adams (14)
| Russell Westbrook (6)
| Mexico City Arena20,562
| 11–13
|- style="background:#cfc;"
| 25
| December 9
| @ Memphis
| 
| Adams, Anthony (21)
| Russell Westbrook (11)
| Russell Westbrook (14)
| FedEx Forum17,794
| 12–13
|- style="background:#fcc;"
| 26
| December 11
| Charlotte
| 
| Russell Westbrook (30)
| Steven Adams (10)
| Russell Westbrook (7)
| Chesapeake Energy Arena18,203
| 12–14
|- style="background:#cfc;"
| 27
| December 13
| @ Indiana
| 
| Steven Adams (23)
| Russell Westbrook (17)
| Russell Westbrook (12)
| Bankers Life Fieldhouse17,923
| 13–14
|- style="background:#cfc;"
| 28
| December 15
| @ Philadelphia
| 
| Russell Westbrook (27)
| Russell Westbrook (18)
| Russell Westbrook (15)
| Wells Fargo Center20,612
| 14–14
|- style="background:#fcc;"
| 29
| December 16
| @ New York
| 
| Russell Westbrook (25)
| Paul George (9)
| Russell Westbrook (7)
| Madison Square Garden19,812
| 14–15
|- style="background:#cfc;"
| 30
| December 18
| Denver
| 
| Russell Westbrook (38)
| Russell Westbrook (9)
| Russell Westbrook (6)
| Chesapeake Energy Arena18,203
| 15–15
|- style="background:#cfc;"
| 31
| December 20
| Utah
| 
| Russell Westbrook (24)
| Russell Westbrook (10)
| Russell Westbrook (7)
| Chesapeake Energy Arena18,203
| 16–15
|- style="background:#cfc;"
| 32
| December 22
| Atlanta
| 
| Russell Westbrook (30)
| Steven Adams (10)
| Russell Westbrook (15)
| Chesapeake Energy Arena18,203
| 17–15
|- style="background:#cfc;"
| 33
| December 23
| @ Utah
| 
| Russell Westbrook (27)
| Russell Westbrook (10)
| Russell Westbrook (10)
| Vivint Smart Home Arena18,306
| 18–15
|- style="background:#cfc;"
| 34
| December 25
| Houston
| 
| Russell Westbrook (31)
| Steven Adams (10)
| Russell Westbrook (11)
| Chesapeake Energy Arena18,203
| 19–15
|- style="background:#cfc;"
| 35
| December 27
| Toronto
| 
| Paul George (33)
| Andre Roberson (10)
| Russell Westbrook (13)
| Chesapeake Energy Arena18,203
| 20–15
|- style="background:#fcc;"
| 36
| December 29
| Milwaukee
| 
| Russell Westbrook (40)
| Russell Westbrook (14)
| Russell Westbrook (9)
| Chesapeake Energy Arena18,203
| 20–16
|- style="background:#fcc;"
| 37
| December 31
| Dallas
| 
| Russell Westbrook (38)
| Russell Westbrook (15)
| Russell Westbrook (11)
| Chesapeake Energy Arena18,203
| 20–17

|- style="background:#cfc;"
| 38
| January 3
| @ LA Lakers
| 
| Terrance Ferguson (24)
| Josh Huestis (9)
| Russell Westbrook (12)
| Staples Center18,997
| 21–17
|- style="background:#cfc;"
| 39
| January 4
| @ LA Clippers
| 
| Paul George (31)
| Russell Westbrook (12)
| Russell Westbrook (11)
| Staples Center19,068
| 22–17
|- style="background:#fcc;"
| 40
| January 7
| @ Phoenix
| 
| Russell Westbrook (26)
| Russell Westbrook (10)
| Russell Westbrook (11)
| Talking Stick Resort Arena18,055
| 22–18
|- style="background:#fcc;"
| 41
| January 9
| Portland
| 
| George, Westbrook (22)
| Russell Westbrook (9)
| Russell Westbrook (12)
| Chesapeake Energy Arena18,203
| 22–19
|- style="background:#fcc;"
| 42
| January 10
| @ Minnesota
| 
| Russell Westbrook (38)
| Russell Westbrook (10)
| Russell Westbrook (5)
| Target Center18,978
| 22–20
|- style="background:#cfc;"
| 43
| January 13
| @ Charlotte
| 
| Russell Westbrook (25)
| Steven Adams (11)
| Russell Westbrook (7)
| Spectrum Center19,624
| 23–20
|- style="background:#cfc;"
| 44
| January 15
| Sacramento
| 
| Paul George (20)
| Russell Westbrook (16)
| Russell Westbrook (9)
| Chesapeake Energy Arena18,203
| 24–20
|- style="background:#cfc;"
| 45
| January 17
| LA Lakers
| 
| Carmelo Anthony (27)
| Steven Adams (10)
| Russell Westbrook (7)
| Chesapeake Energy Arena18,203
| 25–20
|- style="background:#cfc;"
| 46
| January 20
| @ Cleveland
| 
| Paul George (36)
| Carmelo Anthony (10)
| Russell Westbrook (20)
| Quicken Loans Arena20,562
| 26–20
|- style="background:#cfc;"
| 47
| January 23
| Brooklyn
| 
| Russell Westbrook (32)
| Steven Adams (14)
| Russell Westbrook (6)
| Chesapeake Energy Arena18,203
| 27–20
|- style="background:#cfc;"
| 48
| January 25
| Washington
| 
| Russell Westbrook (46)
| Steven Adams (10)
| Russell Westbrook (6)
| Chesapeake Energy Arena18,203
| 28–20
|- style="background:#cfc;"
| 49
| January 27
| @ Detroit
| 
| Russell Westbrook (31)
| Russell Westbrook (11)
| Russell Westbrook (13)
| Little Caesars Arena20,491
| 29–20
|- style="background:#cfc;"
| 50
| January 28
| Philadelphia 
| 
| Russell Westbrook (37)
| Steven Adams (13)
| Russell Westbrook (14)
| Chesapeake Energy Arena18,203
| 30–20
|- style="background:#fcc;"
| 51
| January 30
| @ Washington
| 
| Paul George (28)
| Steven Adams (12)
| Russell Westbrook (10)
| Capital One Arena20,356
| 30–21

|- style="background:#fcc;"
| 52
| February 1
| @ Denver
| 
| Paul George (43)
| Russell Westbrook (9)
| Russell Westbrook (21)
| Pepsi Center18,407
| 30–22
|- style="background:#fcc;"
| 53
| February 2
| New Orleans
| 
| Steven Adams (23)
| Steven Adams (12)
| Russell Westbrook (14)
| Chesapeake Energy Arena18,203
| 30–23
|- style="background:#fcc;"
| 54
| February 4
| L.A. Lakers
| 
| Russell Westbrook (36)
| Carmelo Anthony (13)
| Russell Westbrook (9)
| Chesapeake Energy Arena18,203
| 30–24
|- style="background:#cfc;"
| 55
| February 6
| @ Golden State
| 
| Paul George (38)
| Steven Adams (10)
| Russell Westbrook (9)
| Oracle Arena19,596
| 31–24
|- style="background:#fcc;"
| 56
| February 8
| @ L.A. Lakers
| 
| Paul George (29)
| Adams, George (9)
| George, Felton, Hamilton (3)
| Staples Center18,997
| 31–25
|- style="background:#cfc;"
| 57
| February 11
| Memphis
| 
| Paul George (33)
| Steven Adams (9)
| Felton, George (8)
| Chesapeake Energy Arena18,203
| 32–25
|- style="background:#fcc;"
| 58
| February 13
| Cleveland
| 
| Paul George (25)
| Steven Adams (17)
| Russell Westbrook (12)
| Chesapeake Energy Arena18,203
| 32–26
|- style="background:#cfc;"
| 59
| February 14
| @ Memphis
| 
| Paul George (28)
| Russell Westbrook (13)
| Russell Westbrook (15)
| FedEx Forum16,012
| 33–26
|- align="center"
|colspan="9" bgcolor="#bbcaff"|All-Star Break
|- style="background:#cfc;"
| 60
| February 22
| @ Sacramento
| 
| Paul George (26)
| Russell Westbrook (15)
| Russell Westbrook (11)
| Golden 1 Center17,583
| 34–26
|- style="background:#fcc;"
| 61
| February 24
| @ Golden State
| 
| Russell Westbrook (17)
| Russell Westbrook (12)
| Russell Westbrook (7)
| Oracle Arena19,596
| 34–27
|- style="background:#cfc;"
| 62
| February 26
| Orlando 
| 
| Paul George (26)
| Russell Westbrook (12)
| Russell Westbrook (11)
| Chesapeake Energy Arena18,203
| 35–27
|- style="background:#cfc;"
| 63
| February 28
| @ Dallas
| 
| Russell Westbrook (30)
| Steven Adams (12)
| Russell Westbrook (7)
| American Airlines Center20,202
| 36–27

|- style="background:#cfc;"
| 64
| March 2
| @ Phoenix
| 
| Russell Westbrook (43)
| Russell Westbrook (14)
| Russell Westbrook (8)
| Talking Stick Resort Arena18,055
| 37–27
|- style="background:#fcc;"
| 65
| March 3
| @ Portland 
| 
| Russell Westbrook (30)
| Russell Westbrook (11)
| Russell Westbrook (6)
| Moda Center20,063
| 37–28
|- style="background:#fcc;"
| 66
| March 6
| Houston
| 
| Russell Westbrook (32)
| Steven Adams (8)
| Russell Westbrook (7)
| Chesapeake Energy Arena18,203
| 37–29
|- style="background:#cfc;"
| 67
| March 8
| Phoenix
| 
| Russell Westbrook (27)
| Steven Adams (9)
| Russell Westbrook (9)
| Chesapeake Energy Arena18,203
| 38–29
|- style="background:#cfc;"
| 68
| March 10
| San Antonio
| 
| Russell Westbrook (21)
| Russell Westbrook (12)
| Russell Westbrook (10)
| Chesapeake Energy Arena18,203
| 39–29
|- style="background:#cfc;"
| 69
| March 12
| Sacramento
| 
| Anthony, George (21)
| Russell Westbrook (10)
| Russell Westbrook (11)
| Chesapeake Energy Arena18,203
| 40–29
|- style="background:#cfc;"
| 70
| March 13
| @ Atlanta
| 
| Russell Westbrook (32)
| Russell Westbrook (12)
| Russell Westbrook (12)
| Philips Arena16,739
| 41–29
|- style="background:#cfc;"
| 71
| March 16
| L.A. Clippers
| 
| Corey Brewer (24)
| Steven Adams (14)
| Russell Westbrook (11)
| Chesapeake Energy Arena18,203
| 42–29
|- style="background:#cfc;"
| 72
| March 18
| @ Toronto 
| 
| Russell Westbrook (37)
| Russell Westbrook (13)
| Russell Westbrook (14)
| Air Canada Centre19,800
| 43–29
|- style="background:#fcc;"
| 73
| March 20
| @ Boston
| 
| Russell Westbrook (27)
| Paul George (13)
| Russell Westbrook (7)
| TD Garden18,624
| 43–30
|- style="background:#cfc;"
| 74
| March 23
| Miami 
| 
| Russell Westbrook (29)
| Russell Westbrook (13)
| Russell Westbrook (8)
| Chesapeake Energy Arena18,203
| 44–30
|- style="background:#fcc;"
| 75
| Marsh 25
| Portland
| 
| Russell Westbrook (23)
| Steven Adams (10)
| Russell Westbrook (9)
| Chesapeake Energy Arena18,203
| 44–31
|- style="background:#fcc;"
| 76
| March 29
| @ San Antonio
| 
| Paul George (26)
| Steven Adams (13)
| Paul George (6)
| AT&T Center18,203
| 44–32
|- style="background:#fcc;"
| 77
| March 30
| Denver
| 
| Russell Westbrook (33)
| Steven Adams (10)
| Russell Westbrook (13)
| Chesapeake Energy Arena18,203
| 44–33

|- style="background:#cfc;"
| 78
| April 1
| @ New Orleans
| 
| Russell Westbrook (26)
| Russell Westbrook (15)
| Russell Westbrook (13)
| Smoothie King Center18,500
| 45–33
|- style="background:#fcc;"
| 79
| April 3
| Golden State
| 
| Russell Westbrook (44)
| Russell Westbrook (16)
| Russell Westbrook (6)
| Chesapeake Energy Arena18,203
| 45–34
|- style="background:#cfc;"
| 80
| April 7
| @ Houston
| 
| George, Westbrook (24)
| Steven Adams (8)
| Russell Westbrook (10)
| Toyota Center 18,055
| 46–34
|- style="background:#cfc;"
| 81
| April 9
| @ Miami
| 
| Russell Westbrook (23)
| Russell Westbrook (18)
| Russell Westbrook (13)
| American Airlines Arena19,600
| 47–34
|- style="background:#cfc;"
| 82
| April 11
|  Memphis
| 
| Paul George (40)
| Russell Westbrook (20)
| Russell Westbrook (19)
| Chesapeake Energy Arena18,203
| 48–34

Playoffs

|- style="background:#cfc;"
| 1
| April 15
| Utah
| 
| Paul George (36)
| Russell Westbrook (13)
| Russell Westbrook (8)
| Chesapeake Energy Arena18,203
| 1–0
|- style="background:#fcc;"
| 2
| April 18
| Utah
| 
| Russell Westbrook (19)
| Paul George (10)
| Russell Westbrook (13)
| Chesapeake Energy Arena18,203
| 1–1
|- style="background:#fcc;"
| 3
| April 21
| @ Utah
| 
| Paul George (23)
| Russell Westbrook (11)
| Russell Westbrook (9)
| Vivint Smart Home Arena18,306
| 1–2
|- style="background:#fcc;"
| 4
| April 23
| @ Utah
| 
| Paul George (32)
| Russell Westbrook (14)
| Russell Westbrook (3)
| Vivint Smart Home Arena18,306
| 1–3
|- style="background:#cfc;"
| 5
| April 25
| Utah
| 
| Russell Westbrook (45)
| Russell Westbrook (15)
| Russell Westbrook (7)
| Chesapeake Energy Arena18,203
| 2–3
|- style="background:#fcc;"
| 6
| April 27
| @ Utah
| 
| Russell Westbrook (46)
| Steven Adams (15)
| Paul George (8)
| Vivint Smart Home Arena18,306
| 2–4

Player statistics

Regular season

 Led team in statistic
After all games.
‡ Waived during the season
† Traded during the season
≠ Acquired during the season

Playoffs

 Led team in statistic
After all games.

Individual game highs

Awards and records

Awards

Transactions

Overview

Trades

Free agency

Re-signed

Additions

Subtractions

References

2017-18
2017–18 NBA season by team
2017 in sports in Oklahoma
2018 in sports in Oklahoma